Bradley Hughes (born 10 February 1967) is an Australian professional golfer.

Amateur career

Hughes was born in Melbourne. As an amateur golfer, he won the 1987 and 1988 Victorian Amateur Championship, the 1988 New Zealand Amateur and represented Australia in several competitions including the 1988 Eisenhower Trophy.

Professional career 
Hughes turned professional in October 1988. He finished in 7th place at his first event, the Tasmanian Open, 12th place in his second event, the New South Wales Open, and then took the title in his third event, the Western Australian Open.

He has played on the PGA Tour of Australasia (1988–), European Tour (1990, 1996), Japan Golf Tour (1992–1994), PGA Tour (1997–2002, 2005) and Nationwide Tours (2003–2004, 2006). He participated in the 1994 Presidents Cup for the international team; he was a last-minute replacement for Greg Norman. Hughes remains the lowest-ranked player ever to compete in the Presidents Cup, 117th at the time of selection.

Hughes quit playing competitive golf near the end of 2008 and now teaches at Holly Tree CC in Greenville, South Carolina. He has been credited with helping the resurgence of Brendon Todd on the PGA Tour. He also coaches Brandt Snedeker, Harold Varner III, Cameron Percy, Greg Chalmers, Ben Martin, Robert Allenby and Ollie Schniederjans as well as a host of mini-tour players.

Professional wins (7)

PGA Tour of Australasia wins (4)

1Co-sanctioned by the Asian Tour

PGA Tour of Australasia playoff record (1–0)

Nationwide Tour wins (1)

Nationwide Tour playoff record (1–0)

TRGA Tour wins (1)
2011 TRGA Las Vegas Classic

Other wins (1)
1991 South Australian PGA Championship (Foundation Tier)

Playoff record
Japan Golf Tour playoff record (0–1)

Results in major championships

CUT = missed the half-way cut
"T" = tied

Team appearances
Amateur
Nomura Cup (representing Australia): 1987
Eisenhower Trophy (representing Australia): 1988
Sloan Morpeth Trophy (representing Australia): 1988 (winners)
Australian Men's Interstate Teams Matches (representing Victoria): 1986 (winners), 1987 (winners), 1988

Professional
Presidents Cup (International team): 1994
World Cup (representing Australia): 1996, 1997

See also
1996 PGA Tour Qualifying School graduates
1997 PGA Tour Qualifying School graduates
2004 Nationwide Tour graduates

References

External links

Australian male golfers
PGA Tour golfers
PGA Tour of Australasia golfers
Korn Ferry Tour graduates
Golfers from Melbourne
1967 births
Living people